Ratna Ram Chaudhary ( – 28 November 2019) was an Indian politician from Rajasthan belonging to Indian National Congress. He was a member of the Rajasthan Legislative Assembly. Chaudhary was elected Sarpanch for the first time in the year 1959 in the Panchayat Raj formed after independent India. After this, after being invincible sarpanch for 22 consecutive years, for the first time in 1977, he was elected MLA from the Congress party. Later in 1980, 1990 and 1998 he was also elected as MLA.

Biography
Chaudhary was elected as a member of the Rajasthan Legislative Assembly from Raniwara in 1977. He was also elected from Raniwara in 1980. He was also elected from this constituency in 1990 and 1998.

Chaudhary died on 28 November 2019 at the age of 90.

References

1920s births
2019 deaths
Members of the Rajasthan Legislative Assembly
Indian National Congress politicians from Rajasthan
People from Jalore district